Uchhati is a village in the Biraul block of Biraul subdivision in Darbhanga district, Bihar, India.
This is one of the populous villages in Biraul block. This is hardly one kilometer from Biraul block and two kilometers from Supaul Bazar (Darbhanga). Darbhanga is at the distance of 48 km from this village. The link road of Darbhanga-Saharsa via Biraul passes through this village.

Demographics 
The population of this village according to 2011 census is 8387. The village code is 227739. The sc population is 1254. The ST population is 1. The no. of literate persons is 3578.A branch of Kamala river passes through the west side of the village. The twin villages Bhadhar-Paghari is in the south-east side of this village. The other twin villages Benk-Ballia are in the north-west side of this village. Supaul -Bazar & Biraul are in north side of this village. The village Sonepur is in the east side of this village. The village Kalana is in the south side of this village. ucchhati middle school is the only school in this village. Now this village in nominated to city council Biraul.
Villages in Darbhanga district